Sir Francesco Paolo Tosti KCVO (9 April 1846, Ortona, Abruzzo2 December 1916, Rome) was an Italian composer and music teacher.

Life

Francesco Paolo Tosti received most of his music education in his native Ortona, Italy, as well as the conservatory in Naples. Tosti began his music education at the Royal College of San Pietro a Majella at the age of eleven. He studied violin and composition with Saverio Mercadante, who became so impressed with Tosti that he appointed him student teacher, which afforded the young man a meagre salary of sixty francs a month. Poor health forced Tosti to leave his studies and return home to Ortona. He was confined to his bed for several months. During this time he composed several songs, two of which he submitted to the Florentine Art Society, and two others he submitted for publication to Ricordi. All four were rejected.

Once recovered from his illness, Tosti moved to Ancona, where his poverty was such that for weeks at a time he subsisted on nothing but oranges and stale bread. His travels brought him to Rome, where his fortunes turned. He met the pianist and composer Giovanni Sgambati, who became his patron. Sgambati arranged for Tosti to give a concert at the Sala Dante at which the Princess Margherita of Savoy (who later became Queen of Italy) was present. She was so impressed with his performance that she appointed him her singing professor. She later appointed him curator of the Musical Archives of Italy at the Court.

In 1875 Tosti travelled to London, England. He made several powerful friends who introduced him to the highest levels of English society.  Tosti was a staple in fashionable drawing rooms and salons, and in 1880, he was made singing master to the Royal Family. His fame as a composer of songs grew rapidly while he was in England.  One of his compositions, For Ever and For Ever was introduced by Violet Cameron at the Globe Theatre. This song became a favourite overnight, and there was an enormous demand for his compositions. By 1885 he was the most popular composer of songs in England. His publishers paid him a staggering retaining fee for twelve songs a year.

In 1894 Tosti joined the Royal Academy of Music as a professor. In 1906, he became a British citizen and was knighted (KCVO) two years later by his friend, King Edward VII. A memorial plaque on his former home at 12 Mandeville Place, Marylebone (now the Mandeville Hotel) was unveiled on 12 June 1996.

In 1913 he returned to Italy to spend his last years there. He died in Rome on 2 December 1916.

Works

Tosti is remembered for his light, expressive songs, which are characterised by natural, singable melodies and sweet sentimentality.  He is also known for his editions of Italian folk songs entitled .

His style became very popular during the Belle Époque and is often known as salon music. There is, however, much evidence (albeit fleeting) of a more serious composer particularly in the Canti popolari Abruzzesi, particularly in the introduction to "No. 8 First Waltz".

His most famous works are "Serenata" (lyrics: Cesareo), "Good-bye!" (lyrics: George Whyte-Melville) which is sometimes performed in Italian as "Addio" (lyrics: Rizzelli), and the popular Neapolitan song, "Marechiare", the lyrics of which are by the prominent Neapolitan dialect poet, Salvatore Di Giacomo. "Malia", "Ancora" and "Non t'amo piu" were and remain popular concert pieces.

Tosti wrote well for the voice, allowing, indeed encouraging, interpretation and embellishment from operatic singers.  Most artists, therefore, specialising in the classical Italian repertoire have performed and recorded Tosti songs; yet Tosti never composed opera.  Notable examples on record include Alessandro Moreschi (the only castrato who ever recorded) singing "Ideale", Mattia Battistini singing "Ancora", Nellie Melba singing "Mattinata" and Enrico Caruso singing "A vuchella" and "L'alba separa dalla luce l'ombra".

Songs

'A vucchella
Adieu, My Dear (1887, text by Thomas Carlyle)
Amour!
Ancora! 
Aprile
Ave Maria
Chanson de l'Adieu
Donna, vorrei morir
È' morto Pulcinella!
For ever and for ever!
Good-Bye! (1880)
Ideale
Il pescatore canta
Il segreto
L'alba separa dalla luce l'ombra
L'ultima canzone
L'ultimo bacio
La Mia Canzone
La Rinnovazione
La serenata
Lontano dagli occhi
Luna d'estate
Lungi
M'amasti mai?
Malìa
Marechiare
My love and I
Ninon
Non mi guardare!
Non t'amo più!
O falce di luna calante
Oblio!
Oh! quanto io t'amereit!
Parted
Patti chiari!
Penso
Pierrot's Lament
Plaintes d'Amour (1876)
Pour un baiser
Povera mamma!
Preghiera
Preghiera (Alla mente confusa)
Quattro canzoni di Amaranta
Lasciami, lascia ch' io respiri
L'alba separa dalla luce l'ombra
In van preghi
Che dici,o parola del saggio
Ride bene chi ride l'ultimo
Ridonami la calma
Sogno
T'amo Ancora!
Tormento
Tristezza
Vorrei
Vorrei morire!

References

External links
 Francesco Paolo Tosti - Ricordi Archive

 
 
 F. Paolo Tosti recordings at the Discography of American Historical Recordings.

1846 births
1916 deaths
19th-century classical composers
19th-century British composers
19th-century Italian male musicians
20th-century classical composers
20th-century British composers
20th-century British male musicians
20th-century Italian composers
British classical composers
British male classical composers
British songwriters
Italian Romantic composers
Italian classical composers
Italian male classical composers
Italian songwriters
Italian British musicians
Italian emigrants to the United Kingdom
Male songwriters
Composers awarded knighthoods
Knights Commander of the Royal Victorian Order
Academics of the Royal Academy of Music
People from Ortona
British male songwriters